The 2011 Major League Baseball postseason was the playoff tournament of Major League Baseball for the 2011 season. The winners of the League Division Series would move on to the League Championship Series to determine the pennant winners that face each other in the World Series. This was the last postseason to feature the 8-team format, as next season a new League Wild Card Game was introduced as the new opening round of the postseason, as well as the last time that two teams from the same division could not face each other in the opening round.

In the American League, the New York Yankees returned for the sixteenth time in the past seventeen years, the Texas Rangers returned for the second straight year, the Detroit Tigers returned for the first time since 2006, and was the first of four consecutive appearances by the Tigers. The Tampa Bay Rays returned for the third time in four years.

In the National League, the St. Louis Cardinals returned for the eighth time in the past twelve years, the Milwaukee Brewers made their second appearance in the past four years, the Philadelphia Phillies returned for the fifth straight time, and the Arizona Diamondbacks returned for the first time since 2007.

The postseason began on September 30, 2011, and ended on October 28, 2011, with the Cardinals defeating the Rangers in seven games in the 2011 World Series. It was the Cardinals' 11th title in franchise history, tying the NHL's Detroit Red Wings for the fifth most championship wins in North American sports.

Playoff seeds
The following teams qualified for the postseason:

American League
 New York Yankees - 97–65, Clinched AL East
 Texas Rangers - 96–66, Clinched AL West
 Detroit Tigers - 95–67, Clinched AL Central
 Tampa Bay Rays - 91–71, Clinched Wild Card

National League
 Philadelphia Phillies - 102–60, Clinched NL East
 Milwaukee Brewers - 96–66, Clinched NL Central
 Arizona Diamondbacks - 94–68, Clinched NL West
 St. Louis Cardinals - 90–72, Clinched Wild Card

Playoff bracket

Note: Two teams in the same division could not meet in the division series.

American League Division Series

(1) New York Yankees vs. (3) Detroit Tigers 

†: suspended in the bottom of the second inning due to rain

This was the second postseason meeting between the Yankees and Tigers. They previously met in the 2006 ALDS, which the Tigers won in four games. In a hotly contested five-game series, the Tigers once again defeated the Yankees to return to the ALCS for the second time in six years. The Yankees took Game 1 in a 9-3 blowout win, however the Tigers won the next two games to take the lead in the series. The Yankees blew out the Tigers in Game 4 to send the series back to Yankee Stadium, however the Tigers narrowly held on by one run. 

Both teams would meet again in the 2012 ALCS, which the Tigers won in a sweep.

(2) Texas Rangers vs. (4) Tampa Bay Rays 

This was the second straight postseason meeting between the Rays and Rangers. The Rangers once again defeated the Rays to advance to the ALCS for the second year in a row. The Rays took Game 1 by blowing out the Rangers in a 9-0 shutout, however the Rangers would win the next three games to advance to the next round.

This was the last time the Rangers appeared in the ALDS until 2015.

National League Division Series

(1) Philadelphia Phillies vs. (4) St. Louis Cardinals 

This was the first postseason meeting between the Cardinals and Phillies. The Cardinals upset the heavily favored Phillies in five games to return to the NLCS for the first time since 2006. Both teams split the first two games at Citizens Bank Park - the Phillies prevailed in an offensive duel in Game 1, while in Game 2, the Cardinals overcame a 4-0 lead to win by one run. Cole Hamels helped lead the Phillies to victory in Game 3, while the Cardinals evened the series in Game 4 to send the series back to Philadelphia. The Cardinals closed out the series with a 1-0 shutout in Game 5 to advance, thanks to a solid pitching performance from ace Chris Carpenter.

This was the last time the Phillies appeared in the postseason until 2022. The Cardinals and Phillies would meet in the Wild Card round of that postseason, where the Phillies swept the Cardinals and went on a Cinderella run to the World Series.

(2) Milwaukee Brewers vs. (3) Arizona Diamondbacks

The Brewers defeated the D-Backs in five games to reach their first ever LCS as a member of the National League. Yovani Gallardo helped lead the Brewers to victory in Game 1 with a solid eight-inning performance. In Game 2, with the game tied at four, the Brewers scored five unanswered runs in the bottom of the sixth to win and go up 2-0 in the series headed to Phoenix. The D-Backs blew out the Brewers in Game 3, and won a Game 4 slugfest by a 10-6 score to send the series back to Milwaukee for Game 5. The Brewers would end up defeating the D-Backs in extra innings in Game 5 to advance to the NLCS. This was the first playoff series win by the Brewers since the 1982 ALCS, when the team was still in the American League.

This was the last postseason appearance for the D-Backs until 2017.

American League Championship Series

(2) Texas Rangers vs. (3) Detroit Tigers 

†: postponed from October 9 due to rain

In a highly anticipated series between two teams that were hailed as favorites to make the World Series, the Rangers defeated the Tigers in six games to return to the World Series for the second year in a row. 

The Rangers won Game 1 by a narrow 3-2 score, and then Nelson Cruz won Game 2 for the Rangers in extra innings via a walk-off grand slam. The Tigers won Game 3, however the Rangers took Game 4 in an 11-inning contest to go up three games to one. The Tigers sent the series back to Arlington with a victory in Game 5, but were eliminated in a blowout victory in Game 6. To date, this is the last time the Rangers won the AL pennant, and the last playoff series win by the Rangers franchise.

The Tigers would return to the ALCS the following year, sweeping the New York Yankees to return to the World Series.

National League Championship Series

(2) Milwaukee Brewers vs. (4) St. Louis Cardinals 

This was the first postseason meeting between these two teams since the 1982 World Series, which the Cardinals won in seven games. Just like before, the Cardinals once again defeated the Brewers, this time in six games, to return to the World Series for the first time since 2006. The Brewers won Game 1, however the Cardinals blew out the Brewers in Game 2 to even the series. The Cardinals narrowly won Game 3 to take the lead in the series, but the Brewers would take Game 4 by a 4-2 score to tie the series. The Cardinals again blew out the Brewers in Game 5, and in Game 6 they won in a 12-6 rout to secure the pennant.

The Brewers would not return to the postseason again until 2018, where they reached the NLCS and lost to the Los Angeles Dodgers in seven games. The Cardinals would win one more pennant during the decade, in 2013 against the Dodgers in six games.

2011 World Series

(AL2) Texas Rangers vs. (NL4) St. Louis Cardinals 

†: Postponed from October 26 due to rain

Considered to be one of the greatest World Series ever played, the Cardinals defeated the Rangers in seven games to win their eleventh championship in franchise history. 

Both teams split the first two games at Busch Stadium, and the Cardinals blew out the Rangers 16-7 in Game 3 to take a 2-1 series lead. The Rangers responded by shutting out the Cardinals in Game 4, and then won Game 5 by a 4-2 score to be one win away from their first World Series title. Game 6 was the most memorable contest of the series, in which the Cardinals erased a two-run deficit in the bottom of the 9th inning thanks to a triple by David Freese, then did it again in the 10th. In both innings, the Rangers were one strike away from their first World Series championship, however they could not close out the series, and the Cardinals came back to win thanks to a walk-off home run from Freese in the bottom of the 11th inning. In Game 7, the Rangers again took an early lead in the top of the 1st inning, however the Cardinals would tie the game in the bottom of the first, then scored four more runs in the third, fifth and seventh innings to take the lead for good and secure the title. 

With the loss, the Rangers became the first team since the 1991-92 Atlanta Braves to lose in consecutive World Series appearances. The Cardinals would return to the World Series again in 2013, but fell to the Boston Red Sox in six games. The Rangers returned to the postseason again next year, but fell to the Baltimore Orioles in the AL Wild Card Game.

References

External links
 League Baseball Standings & Expanded Standings – 2011

 
Major League Baseball postseason